Stratificational Linguistics, also known as Neurocognitive Linguistics (NCL) or Relational Network Theory (RNT), is an approach to linguistics advocated by Sydney Lamb that suggests language usage and production to be stratificational in nature. It regards the linguistic system of individual speakers as consisting of networks of relations which interconnect across different 'strata' or levels of language. These relational networks are hypothesized to correspond to maps of cortical columns in the human brain. Consequently, Stratificational Linguistics is related to the wider family of cognitive linguistic theories. Furthermore, as a functionalist approach to linguistics, Stratificational Linguistics shares a close relationship with Systemic Functional Linguistics (SFL).

Linguistic strata 

Stratificational Linguistics suggests that the linguistic system may be analyzed according to separate 'strata', or levels. The strata are ordered hierarchically and, whilst there are no clear-cut boundaries between strata, the elements of each stratum share similar characteristics. For example, a lexical item in the lexicogrammatical stratum is typically a specific sequence of phonemes which connects one or more lexical meanings in the semantic stratum. Several strata are involved in the production of a sound from an initial idea. In linguistic production, each stratum provides actualization or realization for the next lower stratum. Thus, speaking a word would involve a realizational pathway from the semantic stratum to the lexicogrammar, then the phonology, and then the phonetics. The reverse direction is true for linguistic perception and comprehension. 

Some commonly posited stratificational units and their strata include:

The phoneme as the unit on the phonemic stratum.
The lexeme as the unit on the lexical or lexicogrammatical stratum.
The morpheme as the unit on the morphemic stratum.
The sememe as the unit on the semantic stratum.

In contrast to generativist approaches to linguistics, Stratificational Linguistics does not support the notion of an autonomous stratum for syntax. Instead, the term 'lexicogrammar', borrowed from Systemic Functional Linguistics, is preferred because Stratificational Linguistics suggests that syntactic categories are merely labels for classifying different types of lexemes but do not actually play any role in the realization of the lexemes. Rather, it is posited that what is traditionally called 'syntax' is simply the result of what orderings or sequences of lexemes are possible in the lexicogrammatical system of an individual person. In other words, there is no need to posit a separate stratum for syntax to account for syntactic phenomena. It has been further suggested that each lexeme has its own syntactic pattern which determines how it combines with other lexemes, a stance shared with Construction Grammar.

Relational networks 

Linguistic units in Stratificational Linguistics are conceptualised as relational networks. Simply put, a linguistic unit at any stratum is defined in relation to other units. For example, the phonemic sequence /bɔɪ/ may be analyzed as a network node which is activated when the nodes for /b/, /ɔ/ and /ɪ/ are also activated. Similarly, the node for the sequence /tɔɪ/ gets activated when /t/, /ɔ/ and /ɪ/ are also activated. The two sequences /bɔɪ/ and /tɔɪ/ are defined in relation to the set of phoneme nodes /t/, /b/, /ɔ/ and /ɪ/, and their relationships can be graphed as a relational network diagram.

Further reading
 Bennett, David C. 1968. English Prepositions: A Stratificational Approach. Journal of Linguistics 4.2:153-172.
 Lamb, Sydney M. "The Sememic Approach to Structural Semantics 1." American Anthropologist 66, no. 3 (1964): 57-78.
 Lamb, Sydney M. Pathways of the brain: The neurocognitive basis of language. John Benjamins, 1999.
 Lamb, Sydney M. Language and reality: Selected writings of Sydney Lamb. A&C Black, 2004.
 Lockwood, David G. 1969. Markedness in Stratificational Phonology. Language 45.2:300-308.
 White, John. 1969. Stratificational Grammar: A New Theory of Language. College Composition and Communication 20.3:191-197.

References

External links 
LangBrain website

See also
Meaning–text theory
Neurolinguistics
Systemic Functional Linguistics
Construction Grammar
Word Grammar
Stratification

Cognitive linguistics